Something Special is a British children's television programme presented by Justin Fletcher. It was created and co-directed by Allan Johnston. It is broadcast by the BBC, debuting on 1 September 2003. It is designed to introduce children to Makaton signing, and is specifically aimed at children with delayed learning and communication difficulties. It is aired on the CBeebies channel and is currently the longest running CBeebies programme and the longest running preschool series in Britain. In the past, it was also broadcast as part of the CBeebies programme strand on BBC One and BBC Two.

The name of the programme derives from the idea that all children, irrespective of their position on the learning spectrum, are special. The format of the show has evolved considerably since the original series. In 2012, a new series, "Something Special – We're All Friends" started, introducing some minor changes to the "Out and About" format. This format change has also included a change in location, and introduced the Tumble Tapp, a personalised iPad showing the "special things" to look for.

Synopsis 

It is presented by Justin Fletcher ("Justin") and features various other characters and clips of children with disabilities. Justin speaks as well as signing, and a spoken narrative is provided over the clips of children.

The other characters played by Fletcher are the Tumble Family: Mr Tumble, a clown, Grandad Tumble, Fisherman Tumble and Baby Tumble. Other members of the Tumble family to have made appearances include two Aunts – Polly and Suki (as in the popular nursery rhyme "Polly Put the Kettle On"), Lord Tumble and King Tumble.

The creator and producer is Allan Johnston, who worked as a teacher of children with special needs before joining the BBC in 1989, with an important role in the show.

In series 11, 3 animal characters are introduced to the series, Spotty the Horse, who is Mr Tumble's horse that has appeared in the episodes Animals and Animal Keeper, Dennis the T-Rex who is the dinosaur who has only appeared in the episode Dinosaurs, The T-Rex is also a display at Paultons Park where it was filmed, and Rudolph the Red-Nosed Reindeer who appears for a short period of time in the episode A magical Christmas.

The earlier series of the show were taken out of re-run rotation sometime in the early 2010's; CBeebies only airs the past 2-3 most recent series, currently Series 11-13.

Songs 

Hello Song

Lyrics

Hello, hello, how are you?, Hello, hello, it's good to see you, I say hello, I'm happy that you came, I say hello, please tell me, please tell me, Please tell me your name

(Out and About Version)

Hello, hello, how are you?, Hello, hello, it's good to see you, I say hello, Let's go out to play, I say hello, Let's go out and about, out and about, Out and about today

(We're all Friends Version)

Hello, hello, how are you?, Hello, hello, it's good to see you, I say hello, To you and all your friends, I say hello, Let's meet them together, Let's play together, Let's have fun with friends. We're all Friends

Goodbye Song

Lyrics

goodbye, goodbye, It's time to run, goodbye, goodbye, I hope you had good fun, I say goodbye, I'm happy that you came, I say goodbye, please come back, please come back, Please come back again

(New Version)

goodbye, goodbye, It's time to run, goodbye, goodbye, I hope you had good fun, I say goodbye, To you our friends who shine, I say goodbye, please come back, please come back, Please come back next time

goodbye, goodbye, It's always for love, goodbye, goodbye, I hope you special had good fun, And you. I say goodbye, I'm happy that you came, I say goodbye, please come back, please come back, Please come back again very soon

Format 

 Series 1 and 2 (2003–2006) Justin showcases things in a white studio set, with Mr. Tumble sections in the middle of the episodes. Each episode has a duration of approximately 15 minutes.

 Mr Tumble shorts (2007) From 2007, CBeebies occasionally showed short programmes consisting of the Mr Tumble sections from the various episodes, without the sections featuring Justin.

 Series 3 "Out and About" (2008) The first "Out and About" series featured Justin wandering out of the white studio set through the magic doors and into a different location set within the UK. Each episode has a duration of approximately 20 minutes.

 Series 4 "Out and About" (2009)

 Series 5, 6 and 7 Out and About (2010–2011) Series 5 of the show followed the Out and About format of series 3, in a "new, daily, week-day, year-round slot designed to provide continuity for its loyal audience" and introduced a new character, Lord Tumble. The series has Mr Tumble and the other Tumble characters primarily based in "Tumble House", a large detached house located in extensive grounds close to the sea, located in Porlock, Somerset. The house and grounds are populated with large coloured spots, balloons and similar circular/spherical items in keeping with the spots on Mr Tumble's costume. The episodes typically feature Mr Tumble sending photographs of items he is interested in finding out about to Justin using his "Spotty Bag". Justin, with the assistance of the children with him, locates these items or activities and in return sends associated items back to Mr Tumble. There is typically a link in the theme between the actions of Mr Tumble and the other Tumble characters, and the activities Justin and the children participate in.

 Series 8 (Something Special – We're All Friends) (2012) In 2012, a new series, "Something Special – We're All Friends" started, introducing some minor changes to the Out and About format. This format change has also included a change in location, and introduced the "Tumble Tapp", a tablet computer and game (the game was available on the CBeebies website but in Early 2009 it was removed because there was a new one Series 8 was filmed from April 2010 to June 2010

Series 9 (Something Special – We're All Friends) (2014) In 2014, a new series, "Something Special – We're All Friends" starring Justin Fletcher as Mr Tumble as The Unsmiling Principle featuring Mr Tumble, which sees the Mr Tumble, and introduced the "Tumble Tapp in Spotty Bag", and follows him throughout his early life. Series 9 was Fillmed from July 2010 to September 2010

Series 10 (Something Special – We're All Friends) (2016) In 2016, a new series, "Something Special – We're All Friends" starring Justin Fletcher as Mr Tumble as The Unsmiling Principle featuring Mr Tumble, which sees the Mr Tumble, and introduced the "Tumble Tapp in Spotty Bag", and follows him throughout his early life. Series 10 was Filmed from August 2015 to October 2015

The Tale of Mr Tumble In March 2016, a theatrical production starring Justin Fletcher as Mr Tumble and Ronni Ancona as The Unsmiling Principle featuring Mr Tumble was performed, which sees the Mr Tumble character as a baby and as a young boy, and follows him throughout his early life.

Series 11 (Something Special – We're All Friends) (2018) In 2011, a new series, "Something Special – We're All Friends" starring Justin Fletcher as Mr Tumble as The Unsmiling Principle featuring Mr Tumble, which sees the Mr Tumble, and introduced the "Tumble Tapp in Spotty Bag", and follows him throughout his early life. Series 11 Was Filmed from July 2017 to September 2017 The Christmas Special Part 2 was Filmed in November 2017 the Prom was Filmed in June 2017

Series 12 (Something Special – We're All Friends) (2020) Series 12 was filmed from February 2020 to October 2020. The Diwali special was filmed in October 2020.

Series 13 (Something Special – We're All Friends) (2023) Series 13 is set to air in January 2023 with some episodes filmed in the USA and some are co-presented by George Webster.

Series 1 (The Mr Tumble Show - Out and About) (2023) Series 1 is set to air in was filmed from March 2023 with some episodes filmed in the UK and some are co-presented by Justin Fletcher.

Episodes

Series 1 (2003)

Series 2 (2006)

Series 3: Out and About (2008)

Series 4: Out and About (2009)

Series 5: Out and About (2010)

Series 6: Out and About (2010)

Series 7: Out and About (2011)
 
Mr Tumble's Special Day Out 
Note. This Is A Seaside Episode

Series 8: Something Special – We're All Friends (2012)
Motor Home
Concert
Art
Police
Donkey
Gymnastics
Chadani's Day 
Cheerleaders
Monkey
Waterpark
Circus
Ferry
Fishing
Chocolate
Football
Narrowboat
Ice Cream
My Pets 
Lifeboat
Castle
Birds
Outdoors
Pottery
Cycling
Ceilidh

Series 9: Something Special – We're All Friends (2014)
Pig Washing
Snow Tubing
Fire Station
Dance
Boat Trip
Horse Riding by the Sea
Post Office
Train
Camping
Wildlife Park
Seven Stories
Sport
Hats
Dog Walking
Adventure Playground
Aquarium
Cafe
Music
Fruit and Veg Picking
Farm
Planetarium
Beach
Shopping
Cookery
Wetlands Centre

Series 10: Something Special – We're All Friends (2016)
Party
Counting
Wet and Dry
Imagination
Bedtime
Growing
Family
In and Out
Colours
Breakfast
Animals
Adventure
Up and Down
Happy
Lunchtime
Vehicles
Weather
Quiet and Loud
Recycling
Teatime
Summer
Hobbies
Big and Small
Pets
Friends

Series 11: Something Special – We're All Friends (2018)
Great Outdoors
Winter
My School
Radio Star
In the Mood for Dancing
Animal Keeper
Star Chart
Hairdresser
Monkeying Around
Dinosaurs
Library
Fairies
Dentist
Spring
Theatre
Superheroes
Summer
New Shoes
Pairs
Getting Sporty
Autumn
Music Stars
Vets
Imaginary Journey
A Magical Christmas

Series 12: Something Special − We're All Friends (2020)
Basketball
On the River
Golf
Down on the Farm
Theme Park Adventure
Dragon School
Flying Fun
Fairytale
Beach, Boats and Birds
Animal Antics
Day Trip
Woof!
Fruity Fun
Under the Sea
Farmyard Fun
Magic Castle
Let's Pretend
Splish Splash Splosh
Treasure Hunt
Back in Time
Paints and Pottery
Boating Fun
Disco Party
Football Skills
Happy Diwail!

Series 13: Something Special - We're All Friends (2023)
Cinema
Eye Test
Trampoline
Outdoor Adventure
A Big Concert!
The Zoo
Beach Day
Stories
George's Cafe
Alpacas
A Day In The Woods
Aeroplanes 
Pancake Making
Ice Cream Farm 
Let's Go Camping 
Putting On A Play
Bubble Fun 
Outdoor Games 
Shooting Stars 
Growing Vegetables 
Bowling 
Fishing 
Summer Party

Series 1: Out and About (2023)

Specials 
Mr Tumble's Special Day Out
Mr Tumble's Busy Bus Day
Merry Christmas!

Be On Their Own

Awards 
Royal Television Society Educational Television Awards 2004Awarded Best Early Years Programme (for the episode Garden)
BAFTA Children's Awards 2005Awarded Best Pre-school Live Action Series
BAFTA Children's Awards 2007Nominated for Best Presenter (Justin Fletcher)
BAFTA Children's Awards 2008Awarded Best Presenter (Justin Fletcher)
BAFTA Children's Awards 2009Nominated Best Presenter (Justin Fletcher)
BAFTA Children's Awards 2010Awarded Best Presenter (Justin Fletcher)
BAFTA Children's Awards 2011Nominated Best Presenter (Justin Fletcher)
BAFTA Children's Awards 2012Awarded Best Presenter (Justin Fletcher)
BAFTA Children's Awards 2013Nominated Best Presenter (Justin Fletcher)
BAFTA Children's Awards 2018Awarded Best Presenter (Justin Fletcher)

References

External links 
 
Something Special CBeebies Page

BBC children's television shows
British preschool education television series
2000s preschool education television series
2010s preschool education television series
Sign language television shows
Television series by BBC Studios
2003 British television series debuts
2010s British television series
2020s British television series
English-language television shows
CBeebies